Meritas may mean

 Meritas (cloth), a brand of oilcloth and other specialist cloths
 Meritas (education), a network of primary schools
 Meritas (law), a network of business law practices 
 Meritas (Corporation), a Software Development, Technology consulting and Education company in Bangalore, India